The Jo Ryo En Japanese Garden is a Japanese garden located on the campus of Carleton College in Northfield, Minnesota, USA. Commonly translated as the "garden of quiet listening," the garden is a small (1/4 acre) setting located behind Watson Hall on the Carleton College campus.

The garden was conceived and built between 1974 and 1976, under the design guidance of David Slawson. Instigation for the design and construction for the garden came from Bardwell Smith, the John W. Nason Professor Emeritus of Asian Studies at Carlton College.

The garden is in the style of a karesansui or dry landscape garden, and contains several features:
 stone lanterns
 a bamboo drip and basin
 paved stone path (nobedan)
 viewing pavilion
 rock simulating a stream of dark, flat stones emptying into a lake of white gravel
 rocks, low shrubs, and trees to simulate hills and mountains

Entrance to the garden is free.

In 2000, the garden was named one of the 10 highest-quality gardens outside Japan by the Journal of Japanese Gardening.

References

External links 
 Official website
 Article in Journal of Japanese Gardening citing this garden
 David Slawson's design firm

Japanese gardens in the United States
Gardens in Minnesota
Carleton College
Tourist attractions in Rice County, Minnesota